The Journal of Healthcare Management is a bimonthly peer-reviewed academic journal covering management in healthcare. It is published by Lippincott Williams & Wilkins on behalf of the American College of Healthcare Executives. Each issue prints an interview with a leading healthcare executive.

The journal was established in 1956 as Hospital Administration, and was renamed Hospital & Health Services Administration in 1976.  It took its current name in 1998.

Abstracting and Indexing
The journal is indexed and abstracted in the following bibliographic databases:

According to the Journal Citation Reports, the journal has a 2017 impact factor of 1.102.

References

External links 
 

Business and management journals
Bimonthly journals
English-language journals
Publications established in 1956
Lippincott Williams & Wilkins academic journals